Balinac may refer to:

 Balinac (Knjaževac), a village in Serbia
 Balinac, Croatia, a village near Glina, Croatia